Democratic Sentinel is the name of several newspapers, including:

 Cadiz Sentinel, Cadiz, Ohio, previously known as Democratic Sentinel
 Democratic Sentinel (Bloomsburg, Pennsylvania), Bloomsburg, Pennsylvania
 Democratic Sentinel (Rome, New York), Rome, New York
 Democratic Sentinel, San Francisco, merged into Occidental and Vanguard